Cavenagh may refer to:

Forename
 Michael Cavenagh Gillett (1907–1971), British diplomat

Surname
 Alastair Cavenagh (born 1964), Kenyan-based rally driver and entrepreneur
 George Cavenagh (1836–1922), Australian cricketer 
 Orfeur Cavenagh (1820–1891), British army officer and administrator 
 Wentworth Cavenagh (1821–1895), South Australian politician 
 Winifred Cavenagh (1908–2004), British criminologist, social scientist, and academic

Other
 Cavenagh, South Australia, a locality in the District Council of Peterborough
 Cavenagh Bridge, a bridge in Singapore

See also

 Cavenago (disambiguation)
 Hundred of Cavenagh (disambiguation), cadastral units in South Australia